Julie Hayden (1938/39 – September 14, 1981) was an American short story writer and staff member at The New Yorker magazine. In 1976, Viking Press published her only collection of short stories, The Lists of the Past. Day-Old Baby Rats is one of her famous stories, which was chosen and read in 2010 by writer Lorrie Moore on The New Yorker podcast with fiction editor Deborah Treisman. Hayden's story collection was selected by bestselling author Cheryl Strayed for republication with Pharos Editions out of Seattle, and was published in May 2014.

Biography 

Hayden was born in the village of Larchmont, 18 miles from Midtown Manhattan, and educated at Convent of the Sacred Heart, a private girls' school in Greenwich, Connecticut, and at Radcliffe College, from which she graduated cum laude in 1961 with a bachelor's degree in English.

In 1966, she joined the staff of The New Yorker and worked there as the newsbreak editor for 15 years, until her death. During this time, she published ten short stories in the magazine (republished in The Lists of the Past). Shortly following the publication of her collection in 1976, a breast cancer diagnosis and rapid decline into ill health and advancing alcoholism appear to have prevented significant further writing. (Additional research needed on uncollected stories published after 1976).

Hayden was the daughter of Pulitzer Prize-winning author and poet Phyllis McGinley (1905–1978) and her husband Charles L. Hayden, a telephone company worker and jazz pianist who died in 1972. The couple had one other daughter, Patricia.

Hayden was 42 years old when she died of cancer at the Columbia–Presbyterian Medical Center. The New Yorker issue dated the day of her death, September 14, 1981, contained her last piece, a profile on the gardens at the Church of St. Luke in the Fields, where her memorial was held.

Sources
S. Kirk Walsh interviews Cheryl Strayed: New Life for the Fiction of Julie Hayden.

References

The New Yorker editors
People from Larchmont, New York
Radcliffe College alumni
1930s births
1981 deaths
American women non-fiction writers
Women magazine editors
20th-century American women
20th-century American people